Miss Brazil CNB 2021 was the 31st edition of the Miss Brazil CNB pageant and the 6th under CNB Miss Brazil. The contest took place on August 19, 2021. Each state, the Federal District and various Insular Regions & Cities competed for the title. Elís Miele Coelho of Espírito Santo crowned her successor, Caroline Teixeira of Distrito Federal at the end of the contest. Teixeira will represent Brazil at Miss World 2021. The contest was held at the Brasília Palace Hotel in Brasília, Distrito Federal, Brazil. This year's contest was originally supposed to take place in 2020 but was delayed to 2021 due to the COVID-19 pandemic.

Results

Regional Queens of Beauty

Special Awards

Challenge Events

Beauty with a Purpose

Cover Girl

dōTERRA Business Challenge

Miss Mobstar/Miss Multimedia

Miss Talent

Regional Costume

Top Model

Delegates
The delegates for Miss Brazil CNB 2021 were:

Notes

Withdrawals
 - Natali Vitória

Replacements
 - Andreza Viana replaced Paula Joseane after Joseane withdrew from the pageant.

Table Notes

References

External links
 Official site (in Portuguese)

2021
2021 in Brazil
2021 beauty pageants
Beauty pageants in Brazil
Entertainment events in Brazil
Competitions in Brazil
Events postponed due to the COVID-19 pandemic
August 2021 events in Brazil